Lake Hazen is a freshwater lake in the northern part of Ellesmere Island, Nunavut, Canada, north of the Arctic Circle.
It is the largest lake north of the Arctic Circle by volume. By surface area it is third largest, after Lake Taymyr in Russia and Lake Inari in Finland. 

The lake itself is covered by ice about ten months a year. The lake is flanked by the Arctic Cordillera.

Other islands include Gatter Island, Clay Island (both close to the northeastern shore), Whisler Island, and Dyas Island (both close to the southern shore). 

Lake Hazen is often called the northernmost lake of Canada, but detailed maps show several smaller lakes up to more than  farther north on Canada's northernmost island. Turnabout Lake is immediately northeast of the northern end of Lake Hazen.

The lake is part of Quttinirpaaq National Park.

Artifacts of Thule civilization were discovered near Lake Hazen in 2004. Thule preceded the Inuit. In 1882, Adolphus Greely was the first European to discover the lake during his 1881–1883 expedition. Greely named the lake in honour of General William Babcock Hazen, who had organized the expedition. Camp Hazen was established on the northern shore of the lake in 1957 during the International Geophysical Year (IGY), and has been used by various scientific parties since then.

Lake Hazen is populated by two morphotypes of Arctic char, a larger and a smaller. Studies in the 1990s indicated neither char morphotype is anadromous, but Inuit traditional knowledge states otherwise.

Named Inflows

All named rivers and creeks are listed in a clockwise manner, starting in the south:

At the southwestern end (from south to north):
Very River
Adams River

On the northwest coast (from southwest to northeast):
Turnstone River
Henrietta River
Ptarmigan Creek
Blister Creek
Skeleton Creek
Snow Goose River
Abbé River
Cuesta Creek
Mesa Creek
Gilman River

At the northeast end (from north to south):
Turnabout River
Salor Creek

On the southeast coast (only in the southwest, near the southwest end of the lake):
Cobb River
Traverse River

Tourism

In Popular Culture

The location is the object of a major story plot in the movie The Midnight Sky, although the actual filming was done in Iceland.

References

Hazen, Lake
Ellesmere Island